Farkle, or Farkel, is a dice game similar to or synonymous with 1000/5000/10000, Cosmic Wimpout, Greed, Hot Dice, Squelch, Zilch, or Zonk. Its origins as a folk game are unknown, but the game dates back to at least the mid-1980s. It has been marketed commercially since 1996 under the brand name Pocket Farkel by Legendary Games Inc. While the basic rules are well-established, there is a wide range of variation in both scoring and play.

Equipment 
 Dice (6, or 5 in some variations)
 Paper and a pencil or pen for keeping score

Play 

Farkle is played by two or more players, with each player in succession having a turn at throwing the dice. Each player's turn results in a score, and the scores for each player accumulate to some winning total (usually 10,000). 

At the beginning of each turn, the player throws all the dice at once.
After each throw, one or more scoring dice must be set aside (see sections on scoring below).
The player may then either end their turn and bank the score accumulated so far, or continue to throw the remaining dice.
If the player has scored all six dice, they have "hot dice" and may continue their turn with a new throw of all six dice, adding to the score they have already accumulated.  There is no limit to the number of "hot dice" a player may roll in one turn.
If none of the dice score in any given throw, the player has "farkled" and all points for that turn are lost.
At the end of the player's turn, the dice are handed to the next player in succession (usually in clockwise rotation, viewing the table from above), and they have their turn.

Once a player has achieved a winning point total, each other player has one last turn to score enough points to surpass that high-score.

Standard scoring 
The following scores for single dice or combinations of dice are widely established, in that they are common to all or nearly all of the above-cited descriptions of farkle scoring.

For example, if a player throws 1–2–3–3–3–5, they could do any of the following:

score three 3s as 300 and then throw the remaining three dice
score the single 1 as 100 and then throw the remaining five dice 
score the single 5 as 50 and then throw the remaining five dice 
score three 3s, the single 1, and the single 5 for a total of 450 and then throw the remaining die
score three 3s, the single 1, and the single 5 for a total of 450 and stop, banking 450 points in that turn

This is not an exhaustive list of plays based on that throw, but it covers the most likely ones. If the player continues throwing, as in any of the above cases except the last, they risk farkling and thus losing all accumulated points. On the other hand, if they score five dice and have only one die to throw, they have a 1 in 3 chance of scoring a single 1 or a single 5, and then having scored all six dice they will have "hot dice" and can throw all six dice again to further increase their score.

Each scoring combination must be achieved in a single throw. For example, if a player has already set aside two individual 1s and then throws a third with the four dice remaining, they do not have a triplet of 1s for a score of 1000 but merely three individual 1s for a score of 300.

Scoring variations 
Since farkle is a folk game, variant rules are used in different playing communities. While the standard rules described above are widely used, even they are not universal. For example, the commercially marketed game of Pocket Farkel differs in that three 1s are scored as 300 rather than 1000. In addition, some players score one or more combinations of dice beyond the standard ones. Those variations include the following.

No scoring dice are rolled (e.g. 2–2–3–4–6–6) is scored as 500.
Three pair (e.g., 1–1–4–4–6–6) is scored as 500, 600, 750, 1000, or 1500.
A straight (1–2–3–4–5–6) is scored as 1000, 1200, 1500, or 2500.
A full house (three of a kind and a pair) is scored as the three of a kind value plus 250.  e.g. 3–3–3–2–2 = 550, 4–4–4–3–3 = 650, 5–5–5–1–1 = 750, 1–1–1–3–3 = 1250
Four, five and six of a kind are scored in one of 3 ways: adding, doubling or set value:
Adding, for each additional matching die above 3 of a kind, the 3 of a kind score is added.  e.g. 3–3–3 = 300, 3–3–3–3 = 300 + 300 (600), 3–3–3–3–3 = 300 + 300 + 300 (900) and 3–3–3–3–3–3 = 300 + 300 + 300 + 300 (1200).
Doubling, for each additional matching die above 3, 4 or 5 of a kind the score is doubled. e.g. 3–3–3 = 300, 3–3–3–3 = 300 × 2 (600), 3–3–3–3–3 = 300 × 2 × 2 (1200) and 3–3–3–3–3–3 = 300 × 2 × 2 × 2 (2400)
Set value, 4 of a kind is scored as 1000 or 2000, 5 of a kind is scored as 2000 or 4000 and 6 of a kind is scored as 3000, 6000 or 10000

Like the standard combinations, any of these variant combinations must be achieved in a single throw.

These are the variations listed in the above-cited descriptions of farkle scoring, but further variations presumably exist. Since it is a folk game, players are free to agree upon whatever scores they choose for whatever combinations they choose to recognize.

Play variations 
Some farkle rules also incorporate one or more of the following variations in the sequence of play. 

Players may be required to achieve a certain threshold score in their opening turn or turns, before they can begin scoring. Thresholds of 350, 400, 500, or 1000 are used. At the beginning of a game, each player must continue throwing in their turn until they either farkle or reach the threshold. After having reached the threshold once, they are free to stop throwing in subsequent turns whenever they choose.
Play is almost always to 10,000, but can be to 20,000.
In a variant described as "piggybacking" or "high-stakes", each player after the first can choose to begin their turn either with a fresh set of six dice, or by throwing the dice remaining after the previous player has completed their turn. For example, if a player banks three 1s for a score of 1000, the next player may choose to roll the remaining three dice. If they score at least one die, they score 1000 plus whatever additional score they accumulate. Players may thus assume the greater risk of farkling for the chance of scoring the points already accumulated by the player before them. If a player ends their turn on a "hot dice", the next player may "piggyback" using all six dice.
Players may be required to make at least one additional throw when they have hot dice, even if they have accumulated a high enough score that they would choose not to risk farkling.
Three farkles in a row can result in a deduction of 500 or 1000 points from the player's score.
 Another variation is using five dice instead of six. In this version, players cannot score three pair, and this variation often couples an "instant" win option, where on the first roll of the five dice on any turn, if the player rolls five of a kind, that player instantly wins the game, regardless of the scores to that point.
An end-of-game variation described as "welfare" requires the winner to score exactly 10,000 points. If a player scores more than 10,000 points, then all points scored in that turn are given to the player with the lowest score.

Probabilities 
Following are the probabilities of scoring combinations in the initial throw of six dice.

For the most part, less probable combinations are scored higher than more probable combinations (see Scoring Variations).

Following are the probabilities of scoring combinations in subsequent throws of the dice.

Following are the probabilities of farkling if all variant scoring combinations are allowed, depending on the number of dice thrown.

Three-pair is the only scoring variation that alters the likelihood of farkling, and only on the initial throw of six dice. If three pairs are not scored, the probability of farkling on the initial throw increases to 1 in 32.4 (5 in 162).

Following are the probabilities of making hot dice in a single throw if all variant scoring combinations are allowed, depending on the number of dice thrown.

If no variant scoring combinations are allowed, the probabilities of making hot dice are decreased only slightly for 4–6 dice thrown, and unchanged for 1–3 dice thrown.  Odds for these and other die combinations with explanations and simulation results can be found elsewhere.

Effects of scoring variations 
Scoring additional combinations such as straights and three pairs increases the speed of play by awarding high scores for low probability events that otherwise would score little or nothing (for example, a straight with standard scoring is worth only 150 for the single 1 and single 5). To assess the impact of scoring variations, the following table shows the average score on the initial throw of six dice, assuming that all scoring dice are banked and ignoring any additional scores that would be made on a re-roll of hot dice. The first row shows the average score with standard scoring, and the other rows show the increment in that average for each scoring variant that is used in play.

The numbers in the table are calculated based on the following scores for variant combinations:
Four of a kind scores three times the score of the corresponding triplet.
Five of a kind scores five times the score of the corresponding triplet.
Six of a kind scores ten times the score of the corresponding triplet.
A straight scores 2500.
Three pair scores 1500.

The impact of four or five of a kind is substantially similar if they are scored as 1000 and 2000, respectively. If lower scores are awarded for straights or three pairs, the impact on average scoring will be proportionately lower.

The above table somewhat overstates the impact of straight and three pair on overall speed of play, as they only score on the initial throw of six dice.

Video game version 
A video game version of Farkle was announced as one of the six games included with the Intellivision Amico console.

Related games 
 Kismet (dice game)
 Yahtzee

References 

Dice games
Drinking games